Tove of the Obotrites, also called Tova, Tofa or Thora, (10th century) was a Slavic princess and a Danish Viking Age queen consort, the spouse of King Harald Bluetooth.

Tofa, her name carved in runes as ᛏᚢᚠᛅ, was the daughter of Prince Mistivir of the Obotrites, a region also known as Wendland. She married King Harald in January 963. It is not known whether she had any children or not, though some speculation has surrounded her as Sveyn Forkbeard's mother. She had the Sønder Vissing Runestone carved in memory of her mother.

References

	

Danish royal consorts
Harald Bluetooth
Norwegian royal consorts
10th-century births
Year of death unknown
Obotrites
House of Knýtlinga
10th-century Danish people
10th-century Danish women
10th-century Norwegian people
10th-century Norwegian women